Rukirabasaija Patrick David Matthew Kaboyo (Rwamuhokya) Olimi III (9 September 1945 – 26 August 1995) was the 11th Omukama of the Kingdom of Tooro and reigned from 1965 until his death in 1995.

Claim to the throne
He was  son of Rukirabasaija Sir George David Matthew Kamurasi Rukidi III, Omukama of Toro, who reigned from 1928 until 1965. His mother was Lady Byanjeru Kezia Bonabana. He was born at the Royal Palace at Kabarole, on 9 September 1945 with Princess Elizabeth Bagaya as his eldest sister. He attended Budo Primary School, Nyakasura School in Fort Portal, Sherborne School, Dorset, and Makerere University, Kampala. He ascended to the throne upon the death of his father, on 21 December 1965. He was crowned at St John's Cathedral, Kabarole, on 2 March 1966.

Married life
On 10 January 1987, he married Best Kemigisa, daughter of Prince (Omubiito) Mujungu, of the Batuku clan, of Rwebisengo, Bundibugyo District, (Ntoroko District since 2017). She was born in 1967, educated at Kahinju Primary School, Mpanga Senior Secondary School and Kyebambe Girls School, all in the Kingdom of Toro. She is the Founder and Patron Toro Women's Development Association.

Offspring
Omukama Kaboyo Olimi III fathered three children; one son and two daughters.

 Rukirabasaija Oyo Nyimba Kabamba Iguru Rukidi IV, who is the current reigning  Omukama of Toro.
 Princess (Omubiitokati) Ruth Nsemere Komuntale. She was born in 1989. She was educated at Aga Khan Primary School in Kampala and at the International School in Tripoli, Libya. She was installed as the Batebe to her brother, Oyo Nyimba Iguru Rukidi IV, on 12 September 1996.
 Princess (Omubiitokati) Celia Komukyeya. She was born in 1994. She died from leukaemia, at the Royal Marsden Hospital, London, in October 1997.

His reign

Omukama Kaboyo Olimi III was deposed on the abolition of the Kingdoms by the Obote government, on 8 September 1967. He entered the Ugandan Foreign Service in 1986. He served as a Minister-Counselor at the Ugandan High Commission in Dar-es-Salaam, Tanzania, between 1987 and 1990. He was Uganda's Ambassador to Cuba, from 1990 until 1993. On 24 July 1993 he was proclaimed, upon the restoration of the Ugandan kingdoms by the government of Yoweri Kaguta Museveni. He died on 26 August 1995 at his palace in Fort Portal, aged 49.

References

External links

1945 births
1995 deaths
People from Kabarole District
Toro
Toro people
Ugandan monarchies
Ambassadors of Uganda to Cuba
People educated at Sherborne School
Makerere University alumni